Georgina Oliva Isern (born 18 July 1990) is a Spanish field hockey midfielder who competed at the 2008 and 2016 Summer Olympics. She was included to the national team in 2006, and in 2015 named Best Player at the Valencia semifinal of the 2014/15 World League and Best Player in the Spanish Division de Honor.
Individual award : Player of the Tournament in 2019 Women's EuroHockey Nations Championship

References

External links
 
 

1990 births
Living people
Spanish female field hockey players
Olympic field hockey players of Spain
Field hockey players at the 2008 Summer Olympics
Field hockey players at the 2016 Summer Olympics
Field hockey players at the 2020 Summer Olympics
Expatriate field hockey players
Spanish expatriate sportspeople in the Netherlands
Sportspeople from Terrassa
Female field hockey midfielders
SV Kampong players
Atlètic Terrassa players